Karl Otto Ludwig von Arnim (1 August 1779 in Berlin – 9 February 1861 in Berlin) was a German travel writer.

Biography
He studied at Halle and Göttingen, and then traveled through Europe.  He was then an attaché in Stockholm, at times directing the royal theater in Berlin. In 1835, he began another series of travels, this time through southern Europe. His books of travel in France, Italy, Spain, Russia, and the orient, Hurried remarks of a traveler in a hurry (Berlin, 6 vols., 1838–50), were much valued.

In his earlier years, he also wrote for the stage:  New means for paying old debts (a play in five acts after Massinger; debuted 19 January 1821 in Berlin) and Der Smaragdring (in 4 acts; debuted under the name of C. Marinof’s on 10 April 1828 in Berlin).

Notes

References
 
 
 

1779 births
1861 deaths
Writers from Berlin
19th-century German dramatists and playwrights
German male dramatists and playwrights
19th-century German male writers
19th-century German writers
Karl Otto Ludwig